Ashley Monique Clark (born December 1, 1988) is an American television actress best known for her role as Sydney Hughley (D.L. Hughley's TV daughter) on the ABC and UPN television program, The Hughleys.

Career
Clark made her professional television debut in 1996 as a member of a Bluebird troop on The Fresh Prince of Bel-Air, then a year later, in 1997, she played a young version of Brandy Norwood's titular character on the sitcom, Moesha, then Clark had a recurring role as Jaleen on Sunset Beach which she appeared for eight episodes, she was then cast as Sydney Hughley in D.L. Hughley's sitcom, The Hughleys.

Shortly after The Hughleys ended in 2002, with a total of four seasons and  89 episodes, Clark appeared in Zoey 101 and Still Standing.

She also had a supporting role in the movie Love Don't Cost a Thing, as well as a recurring role on The Bernie Mac Show as Teri, one of Vanessa's friends, from 2003 to 2006. She has also appeared on Hollywood Squares.

Filmography

References

External links

1988 births
Actresses from New York City
American child actresses
American film actresses
American television actresses
Living people
People from Brooklyn
21st-century American women